Events from the year 1578 in Sweden

Incumbents
 Monarch – John III

Events

 Swedish victory over Russia in the Battle of Wenden.
 The king attempt to expel the Romani by threatening with forced labor in the Sala silver mine.

Births

Deaths

 Filippa Fleming, Finnish heiress and landowner (born unknown)

References

 
Years of the 16th century in Sweden
Sweden